Hans Goldschmid (6 March 1919 – 13 July 1981) was an Austrian cyclist. He competed in three events at the 1948 Summer Olympics.

References

External links
 

1914 births
1981 deaths
Austrian male cyclists
Olympic cyclists of Austria
Cyclists at the 1948 Summer Olympics
Burials at Ottakring Cemetery